Christian Jolly is an American North American champion bridge player.

Bridge accomplishments

Wins
 North American Bridge Championships (1)
 Wernher Open Pairs (1) 2022

Personal life
Christian lives in Atlanta.

References

American contract bridge players
Living people
Year of birth missing (living people)
Sportspeople from Atlanta